Atimiliopsis ochripennis is a species of beetle in the family Cerambycidae, and the only species in the genus Atimiliopsis. It was described by Breuning in 1974.

References

Desmiphorini
Beetles described in 1974
Monotypic Cerambycidae genera